Simon Hughes (born 1951) is a British politician.

Simon Hughes may also refer to:

 Simon Hughes (cricketer) (born 1959), English cricketer and journalist
 Simon Pollard Hughes Jr. (1830–1906), governor of Arkansas